131 may refer to:

131 (number)
AD 131
131 BC
131 (album), the album by Emarosa
131 (MBTA bus), the Massachusetts Bay Transportation Authority bus. For the MBTA bus, see 131 (MBTA bus).
131 (New Jersey bus), the New Jersey Transit bus